Achaeta eiseni is a species of annelids belonging to the family Enchytraeidae.

It is native to Europe.

It is named after Gustav Eisen.

References

Annelids